Loving County is a county in the U.S. state of Texas. With a population of 64 per the 2020 census, it is the least-populous county in the United States. Its county seat and only community is Mentone. The county was originally created in 1887, and after being disorganized in 1897, was reorganized in 1931.

History

Nomadic hunters inhabited the area during prehistory. Antonio de Espejo traveled in the area in 1583, and crossed the Pecos River. Immigrants used a ford, later named Pope's Crossing, for travel in the 1840s. John Pope surveyed the area in 1854, for the building of a  transcontinental railroad. He created a camp in 1855, and conducted three drilling attempts, but only found water once and was unable to access it. Andrew A. Humphreys ordered Pope to end his drilling and abandon the camp on July 10, 1858. Soldiers were stationed at the camp created by Pope from 1858 to 1861. The route of the Butterfield Overland Mail went through the area.

Oliver Loving, after whom the county was named, and Charles Goodnight drove cattle through the area in 1866, creating the Goodnight–Loving Trail. Loving was shot by a Comanche native in 1867, and died from gangrene. The area was a part of Bexar County from 1837 to 1874, when it became a part of Tom Green County. Eleven people in the area, including Clay Allison, petitioned to the 19th session of the Texas Legislature to become a part of Reeves County. Loving County was created in 1887, by House Bill No. 113, although it was to be attached to Reeves County for purposes, including judicial and surveying.

Six men from Denver came to the county in 1893, and founded the Loving Canal and Irrigation Company and Mentone, which was named by a French surveyor for his home of Menton, France. On June 13, the men filed a petition with 150 signatures to the Reeves County Commissioners Court requesting the organization of the county and it was accepted. The county organization was approved by an election held on July 8, with 83 voters participating, and Mentone became the county seat. Another election was held in 1894, and both elections held in the county are believed to have been fraudulent. The county commission issued bonds worth $6,000 to construct a courthouse in Mentone, but the project was not completed as a flood in August destroyed the work that was done on the irrigation project. Accusations of illegal county organization arose, which were investigated by H. C. Withers and A. H. Randolph. They were informed by W.A. Hunter, the sheriff and tax collector, that R. G. Munn, the county clerk, had taken the tax records to Denver. All of the county officials had left the county by 1897, and the county was dissolved on May 12, 1897, and returned to Reeves County.

In December 1896, Hunter traveled to Pecos, Texas, but went missing with his horses either dying from starvation or being unaccounted for. His sister, Jennie M. Mettler, attempted to receive the $15,000 in life insurance that Hunter took out in November, but the insurance company refused to pay, as Hunter's body was not discovered. She filed a lawsuit and won in the first case and in the appeal made by the company to the Supreme Court of the United States. Hunter was found living in Birmingham, Alabama, under the name of Al Hunt in 1902. He had abandoned one of his horses, while riding the other one, to take a train from Barstow, Texas. He was sentenced to serve five years in prison, but his conviction was overturned on appeal.

The county has no cemetery, and the only grave in the area is for Shady Davis, a 21-year-old cowboy who was killed by his horse and buried 12 miles from Mentone in the 1920s. The population in the area increased following the discovery of oil, and led to the creation of the town of Ramsey. Loving County was reorganized in 1931, becoming the only county in Texas to be organized twice, and Ramsey was later renamed as Mentone.

On November 17, 2020, during the COVID-19 pandemic, Loving County was the last county in the contiguous United States to confirm at least one case of COVID-19, with three cases confirmed in the area. Earlier in August, a nonresident male at a man camp was confirmed to have contracted the disease. Additionally, at least two residents who had contracted the disease elsewhere returned to Loving County and quarantined, but those cases were not counted in the county's totals.

Geography
The county is three-fifths the size of Rhode Island.

Water in the area has to be imported from Kermit or Pecos, Texas, due to the groundwater in the area containing gypsum; the Pecos River was previously used for water before its salinity became too high. The Pecos River is the county's western boundary, forming the Red Bluff Reservoir along its northwestern border with Reeves County and Eddy County, New Mexico. The terrain of Loving County is described as flat desert, with a few low hills. Desert shrubs, range grasses, and cacti abound, with salt cedars along the river.

Loving is the smallest county by area in the Permian Basin region.

Major highways
  State Highway 302
  Ranch to Market Road 652

Adjacent counties
 Lea County, New Mexico (north/Mountain Time Zone)
 Winkler County (east)
 Ward County (southeast)
 Reeves County (southwest)
 Eddy County, New Mexico (northwest/Mountain Time Zone)

Communities

Unincorporated communities 
 Mentone

Ghost towns 
 Hay Flat (mostly in Winkler County)
 Porterville
 Woody

Demographics

Note: the US Census treats Hispanic/Latino as an ethnic category. This table excludes Latinos from the racial categories and assigns them to a separate category. Hispanics/Latinos can be of any race.

As of the 2020 United States census, 64 people, 30 households, and 20 families resided in the county, down from 67 people, 31 households, and 19 families living in the county in 2000. 

The county had been the least-populous county in the United States, with a 2010 census population of only 82 persons (an increase of 22.4% over the 2000 figure of 67 residents), but the 2015 estimate by the U.S. Census Bureau places it as the second-least populous county nationwide. With an average of only 0.0646 inhabitants/km2 (0.167/sq mi) as of 2015, the county is also the least-densely populated county outside of Alaska. Lake and Peninsula Borough and North Slope Borough in Alaska are both lower, as is the Yukon-Koyukuk census area.

The majority of the population since 2000 has been non-Hispanic white, though six identified as "some other race" and one person identified as multiracial. Additionally, in the 2000 census, seven people identified as being of Hispanic, Latino, or Spanish origin of any race. Loving is one of only a few counties in the U.S. outside of the Northeast where the largest self-identified ancestry group is Irish-American.

Five of the 31 households in 2000 had children under 18, 17 were married couples living together, two had a female householder with no husband present, and 11 were not families. Ten households were made up of individuals, and two consisted of someone living alone who was 65 or older. The average household size was 2.16, while the average family size was 2.65. In 2020, there were 25 households and 13 were married couples living together.

In 2000, the population included 13 people under 18, one between 18 and 24, 18 from 25 to 44, 24 from 45 to 64, and 11 who were 65 or older. The median age was 46 years. For every 10 females, there were 11.61 males. For every 10 females 18 and over, there were 12.50 males. By 2020, 21.4% of the population were under 5, 74.5% were 18 and older, including 25.5% who were 65 and older; the median age increased to 55.2 years, up from the state's median age of 35.1.

From 2015 to 2019, the median household income for the county was $83,750, up from $40,000 in 2000. Owing partly to its small and dispersed population, it had the highest median per capita and household incomes of any county in Texas. Loving County was the only county in the United States with no people below the poverty line as of 2000; as of 2010, this was no longer true.

Three people were living in the county, all males in the same house, according to the 1890 United States census. Following the disestablishment of Mentone in 1897, no settlements were in the county until the creation of Juanita in 1910, which was renamed to Porterville. The 1970 United States census recorded the county as the least-populated county in the United States.

Politics and government

Since the 1988 election, early voting has accounted for at least 13.11% of votes in the county, with early voting accounting for a majority of the votes in the 1994 election with 53.54%, 1998 election with 50%, 2000 election with 74.36%, 2006 election with 58.89%, and 2020 election with 68.18%. The lowest voter turnout since the 1988 election was in the 2018 election with 49% and the highest in the 1990 election with 85.71%. The county had the highest voter turnout in Texas in the 1986 election. At some points in the county's history, the county had more registered voters than residents and precincts closed early to deny people the ability to vote.

J. J. Combs was appointed as county judge by the county commission on September 6, 1893. Edna Reed Clayton DeWees served as sheriff in the county from 1946 to 1948, making her the first woman to be elected as sheriff in both the county and the state.

The county judge is the highest elected official in the county and the position has been held by Skeet Jones since 2007. The Creager family once had family members who served as county judge, postmaster, sheriff, tax assessor, and county commission member. The Joneses are a political family in the county with members of the family controlling the positions of judge, clerk, attorney, and constable. The Jones family is a ranching family who moved to the county when Elgin "Punk" Jones and Mary Belle Jones built their ranch in 1953. Mary Belle stated in 1997 that she asked her husband, "how long are we going to live in this godforsaken place?". Punk served as the sheriff for 28 years and Mary Belle served as the chief appraiser. Skeet was arrested in 2022, with two other men, for stealing livestock.

In 2022, Sheriff Chris Busse reported that a ranch with 11 registered voters, including county commissioner Ysidro Renteria, had no inhabitants since 2008.

Economy

Three cattle businesses were in the county in 1887, with 12,100 cattle worth $96,800, and the county had a livestock value of $568,406 in 1900. Taxes were not collected in the area from 1893 to 1896. The Toyah-Bell Oil Company, created in 1921, became the first oil producer in the county later that year. Oil production in the area reached its height in 1931, with 1,233,801 barrels.

The county accounted for 0.057% of the wealth in Texas in 1970, and had no unemployment or any residents on welfare. The county had the sixth-highest unemployment rate in the country in 1986, with 29.7% unemployment. The Texas Almanac listed 15 ranches in the county in 1986-1987, with the average size being above 23,000 acres and being worth above an average of $4 million. The county has one of the highest per capita incomes in the United States due to oil revenue, with its residents having a per capita income of $32,505 in 1983, compared to the national average of $9,496. In 1986, taxes on oil and gas companies accounted for 99% of tax revenue in the county.

Loving County's economy is based almost entirely upon oil and gas production, ranching, and county services.

Education

No federal funding was ever given to schools in the county as of 1970, and its school was still racially segregated. In 1970, the elementary school had 30 students and three teachers, while the 17 high school students were educated in Winkler County. The elementary school in Mentone was closed in 1978, as the school only had two students and two teachers left and the county voted to consolidate into the Wink-Loving Independent School District. The county is zoned to Wink-Loving Independent School District and Odessa College.

In popular culture
"Loving County"  is the name of a song written and performed by Charlie Robison.  It appears on his 1998 album Life of the Party.
In the novel Echo Burning by Lee Child, Jack Reacher passes through Loving County.

See also
 National Register of Historic Places listings in Loving County, Texas
 Recorded Texas Historic Landmarks in Loving County

References

External links

  Contains valuable information on early history of Loving County.
 Loving County Texas Almanac Page
 Mentone from MyWestTexas.com Brief but detailed report on life in Mentone and Loving County.  Includes several videos of Mentone and interviews with the local sheriff and judge.
 Loving County at Davickservices.com Numerous photos and stories about Loving County and Mentone.  A small picture of the "wanted" poster for Mssrs. Pendarvis, Emory and Duncan may also be seen here
 Inventory of county records, Loving County Courthouse, Mentone, Texas, hosted by the Portal to Texas History
 Loving County Profile Detailed information about Loving County population.

 
1931 establishments in Texas
Populated places established in 1931